The 2022 Angel City FC season is the team's inaugural season as a professional women's soccer team. Angel City FC plays in the National Women's Soccer League, the top tier of women's soccer in the United States.

Team

Management and staff 
On August 15, 2022, Angel City FC promoted vice president of player development and operations Angela Hucles to general manager, taking on some of the roles previously held by sporting director Eniola Aluko.

Roster

On loan

Player Statistics 

Angel City has used a total of 23 players during the 2022 season, and there have been 9 different goal scorers. There have also been five squad members who have not made a first-team appearance in the campaign: three goalkeepers, Sarah Gorden and MA Vignola, who have long term injuries.

The team has scored a total of 25 goals in all competitions. Savannah McCaskill with 7 goals, is the highest scorer, followed by Christen Press and Cari Roccaro with 4 goals each.

Key

No. = Squad number

Pos = Playing position

Nat. = Nationality

Apps = Appearances

GK = Goalkeeper

DF = Defender

MF = Midfielder

FW = Forward

 = Yellow cards

 = Red cards

Numbers under APPS indicate starts, and numbers in parentheses denote appearances as substitute. Players with name struck through and marked  left the club during the playing season.

Competitions 
  

All times are in PT unless otherwise noted.

NWSL regular season

Regular-season standings

Results summary

Results by matchday

NWSL playoffs

NWSL Challenge Cup

Group stage

Divisional standings

International club friendlies 
On May 24, 2022, Angel City FC announced a two-year partnership with Liga MX Femenil club Tigres UANL of Monterrey, Mexico. The agreement included friendlies to be played between the clubs, with the first occurring on August 10, 2022, at the Banc of California Stadium in Los Angeles, and the second in 2023 at Estadio Universitario in Monterrey. TUDN announced it would stream the match via the ViX service, and the match was also scheduled to be televised in the Los Angeles area on Bally Sports SoCal.

On June 27, 2022, Angel City FC and the Federación Mexicana de Fútbol announced the Copa Angelina, an inaugural non-FIFA friendly match between the club and the Mexico women's national football team scheduled for Labor Day (September 5, 2022) in Los Angeles. The match was broadcast live on TUDN and Univision in the United States and Mexico. Mexico won the inaugural friendly 2–0.

References

External links 
 Official website

2022 National Women's Soccer League season
American soccer clubs 2022 season
Angel City FC seasons
Angel City FC